Murrumbidgee Council is a local government area in the Riverina region of New South Wales, Australia. This area was formed in 2016 from the merger of the Murrumbidgee Shire with the neighbouring Jerilderie Shire.

The combined area comprises  and covers the urban areas of Coleambally, Darlington Point and Jerilderie and the surrounding cropping and pastoral areas. At the time of its establishment, the estimated population of the area was 4,047.

The inaugural Mayor of Murrumbidgee Council is former Jerilderie Shire councillor Ruth McRae, elected on 21 September 2017. Cr McRae was elected as Mayor for the second term on 24 September 2019.

Demographics

Heritage listings
The Murrumbidgee Council has a number of heritage-listed sites, including:
 Darlington Point, Warangesda: Warangesda Aboriginal Mission
 Jerilderie, Nowranie Street: Jerilderie railway station

Council
Murrumbidgee Council has nine Councillors, with three councillors elected proportionally from three wards - Jerilderie, Murrumbidgee and Murrumbidgee East. All Councillors are  elected for a fixed four-year term of office. The Mayor and Deputy Mayor are elected for 12 month terms, each September.

The most recent election was held on 9 September 2017, and the Councillors elected are as follows:

See also

 Local government areas of New South Wales

References

 
Local government areas of the Riverina
2016 establishments in Australia